North Dakota is a state in the United States.

North Dakota may also refer to:

USS North Dakota (BB-29), former battleship
USS North Dakota (SSN-784), submarine
North Dakota State University
North Dakota State Bison athletic teams representing the state university
"North Dakota", song on Thrush Hermit's album Sweet Homewrecker
 North Dakota, pseudonym for a character in Dan Brown's novel Digital Fortress
 North Dakota (album)
 University of North Dakota
 North Dakota Fighting Hawks athletic teams representing the university

See also

Dakota (disambiguation)
Dakota North (disambiguation)
SS Flickertail State, named for the state of North Dakota, which is also known as the Flickertail State